Elections to South Hams District Council took place on 6 May 1999, the same day as other United Kingdom local elections. This was the first election to be held under new ward boundaries, with the number of seats reduced from 44 to 40 The Conservative Party gained overall control of the council, which had previously been under no overall control.

References

1999 English local elections
1999
1990s in Devon